MES may refer to:

Educational institutions
 Maharashtra Education Society, Pune, India
 Modern Education Schools, Cairo, Egypt
 MES College of Engineering
 MES Institute of Technology and Management
 MES Pattambi

Companies and organizations 
 Marconi Electronic Systems, a defunct British company
 Mesaba Airlines, former US airline, ICAO code
 Military Engineering Service, of the Pakistan Army
 Ministry of Emergency Situations (disambiguation), departments of various governments
 Former Movement of Socialist Left, Portugal

Chemicals 
 MES (buffer), 2-(N-morpholino)ethanesulfonic acid
 Mesityl group (Mes) in Mesitylene

Economics and business 
 Manufacturing execution systems, to track materials
 Minimum efficient scale of production

Places 
 Mes, Albania, location of the Mesi Bridge
 Polonia International Airport, Medan, Indonesia, IATA code

Technologies 
 Marine evacuation system, on ships
 Medium Edison screw, E26/E27 light bulb base
 Multilingual European subsets (MES-1 to MES-3) of Unicode

Other uses 
 Musical ear syndrome
 Maharashtra Ekikaran Samiti, a social committee based out of Belagavi city of India's Karnataka state
 Mark E. Smith, English singer and frontman of The Fall

See also 
 Mees (disambiguation) 
 Mez (disambiguation)